Artillery Knob is a mountain in the Cradle Mountain-Lake St Clair National Park in the Central Highlands region of Tasmania, Australia. It is the 57th highest mountain in Tasmania. It is a prominent feature of the national park, and is a popular venue with bushwalkers.

See also

 Highest mountains of Tasmania

References

External links
 Parks Tasmania

Artillery Knob
Central Highlands (Tasmania)
Cradle Mountain-Lake St Clair National Park